Thomas Wotton (1582-1669) was a surgeon who traveled to Jamestown, Virginia in 1607 with the original group of colonists.<ref>Tyler, Lyon Gardiner, ed. Encyclopedia of Virginia biography"]. Volume 1. New York: Lewis Historical Publishing Company, 1915. . Retrieved July 15, 2011. p. 364.</ref> Another surgeon, Will Wilkinson, also was among the first colonists.  Wotton was described as a "gentleman" while Wilkinson was identified with the laborers and craftsmen.

Captain John Smith praised Wilkinson for his treatment of the sick. Edward Maria Wingfield, when council president, on the other hand, criticized Wilkinson for staying aboard ship during periods of great need. Wingfield would not provide funds for Wilkinson to purchase drugs and other necessities because of his view of Wilkinson's slothfulness.Proctor wrote that the colony could only have suffered from the misunderstanding. Proctor, 1970, p. 60.

Captain Christopher Newport who brought the first settlers from England took Wotton on his journey up the James River on the Susan Constant to the falls at Richmond, Virginia before he returned to England for supplies. Wotton stayed to help care for the colonists.

In a compilation of abstracts of English wills from the 17th century, the compiler notes that Thomas Wotton, barber and surgeon, whose will was dated March 15, 1635 and proved April 28, 1638, may have been the same Thomas Wotton who accompanied the first settlers to Jamestown.

Notes

References
 Hughes, Thomas Proctor. 'Medicine in Virginia 1607 - 1699'. Charlottesville, VA: Univ. Press of Virginia, 1970. . Retrieved March 2, 2013.
 Tyler, Lyon Gardiner, ed. [https://books.google.com/books?id=UCgSAAAAYAAJ Encyclopedia of Virginia biography". Volume 1. New York: Lewis Historical Publishing Company, 1915. . Retrieved July 15, 2011.
 Withington, Lothrop. 'Virginia Gleanings in England: Abstracts of 17th and 18th-century English wills and administrations relating to Virginia and Virginians: a consolidation of articles from The Virginia magazine of history and biography'. Baltimore: Genealogical Publishing Company, 1980. Reprinted 1998 by Clearfield Publishing Company. Excerpted from Virginia Magazine of History and Biography. . Retrieved March 2, 2013.
 Woolley, Benjamin. 'Savage Kingdom: Virginia and The Founding of English America'. New York : HarperCollins Publishers, 2007. . Retrieved March 2, 2013.

Virginia colonial people
1582 births
1669 deaths
People from Jamestown, Virginia
English emigrants